Jotform is a San Francisco–based company for building online forms.

History
Jotform was founded in 2006 by Aytekin Tank.

In 2011, it released Wishbox, a feedback tool that annotates screenshots.

By 2012, Jotform had over 700,000 users and published over two million user forms.

In February 2012, the United States Secret Service shut down the Jotform site as part of a concealed investigation of user-created forms. After two days, it was back online.

Jotform released an Adobe Document Cloud eSign Widget in June 2015 for embedded e-signing into forms.

In April 2016, Jotform announced that its software was available on Weebly. In December 2016, the company partnered with IFTTT to integrate an "Applet" to create forms in other applications. Tech Times recognized Jotform's integration on Slack as one of the "Best Productivity Apps" of 2016.

In 2018, Jotform acquired Noupe, an online magazine.

In 2022, Jotform is the No. 1 online form builder in G2’s Summer Report.

Software
Jotform offers its customers a drag-and-drop form builder in which the users are able to customize anything related to the form. Conditional logic can also be set. The product also integrates with many other major software tools.
 
In addition to being a form builder, Jotform has produced other products, such as Jotform Apps in 2021, a no-code app builder, and Jotform Sign in 2022, an e-signature collection tool.

Locations
In addition to the headquarters of the company in San Francisco, there are six Jotform offices throughout the world: three of them have been located in Turkey (Ankara, Izmir and Istanbul), along with the offices in London, Vancouver and Sydney.

References

Electronic signature providers
Software companies established in 2006
Internet properties established in 1999
Companies based in San Francisco
Software companies based in the San Francisco Bay Area
Polling companies
2006 establishments in California